The Good Old Democratic Party (GOD), also known as Good Old Democracy, is a minor political party in Grenada founded and led by Justin Francis McBurnie. It first contested parliamentary elections in 1990, when it received only six votes for McBurnie, its sole candidate, and failed to win a seat. 

McBurnie died on 19 January 2021.

Electoral history

References

External links
GOD Manifesto 2013

Political parties in Grenada
Political parties established in 1990
1990 establishments in Grenada